Fernando "Nito" de Lacerda Gomes (born 3 February 2002) is a Bissau-Guinean footballer who plays as a centre-back for Marítimo.

Professional career
Gomes began his senior career with the reserves of the Spanish club Talavera in 2021, followed by a stint with Trujillo in the Tercera División. He transferred toMarítimo B] side on 23 October 2022. He was promoted to their senior team on 19 January 2023. He made his professional debut with Marítimo a couple of days later as a late substitute in a 1–0 Primeira Liga win over Estoril on 22 January 2023.

International career
Gomes represented the Guinea-Bissau U20s at the 2020 WAFU Zone B U-20 Tournament.

References

External links
 
 
 
 FFGBissau profile

2002 births
Living people
Sportspeople from Bissau
Bissau-Guinean footballers
Guinea-Bissau youth international footballers
CF Talavera de la Reina players
Tercera División players
Primeira Liga players
Campeonato de Portugal (league) players
Association football defenders
Bissau-Guinean expatriate footballers
Bissau-Guinean expatriate sportspeople in Spain
Expatriate footballers in Spain
Bissau-Guinean expatriates in Portugal
Expatriate footballers in Portugal